Clinton County is a county located in the U.S. state of Iowa. As of the 2020 census, the population was 46,460. Its county seat is Clinton. Its name is in honor of the seventh Governor of New York State, DeWitt Clinton.

Clinton County comprises the Clinton, IA Micropolitan Statistical Area, which is also included in the Davenport–Moline–Rock Island Metropolitan Statistical Area.

History
Clinton County was formed on December 21, 1837.  It was named for DeWitt Clinton, a Governor of New York and most ardent advocate for the construction of the Erie Canal.  The cities of DeWitt and Clinton were also named after him.

In 1835, Elijah Buell built a log cabin for himself and his family and was thus the first settler of the region.  In 1854, the first newspaper was issued and in 1858, the Lyons Female College for girls opened its doors. The tuition was set at $175 per student.

The county has used three courthouses in its history.  The structure currently in use was constructed in Romanesque style and opened in 1897.

Early settlement
Clinton county was first settled in 1836, by Mr. Bourne, who located upon Sec. 1, T. 80, R. 4, East. The county was surveyed in 1837, by the Messrs. Burtz. The Surveyor General's office was then at Cincinnati, Ohio. In 1840, the county was organized by Sheriff Bourne. In 1841, R. R. Bed ford and others formed a little settlement at De Witt, and during the same year Messrs. Wheeler and Evans erected a log court-house. In stepping from the past to the present, we quote the language of one of the "oldest inhabitants." He says: "Clinton County was originally settled by the poorest class of people on God's earth; and it is with great pleasure that I have witnessed their progress, slow but sure, and now find the most of them very comfortably situated."

The population of this County in 1840, was 821; in 1850, 2822; in 1854, 7000; and in 1856, 11,000. The population of Lyons in 1850, was 453. In 1856 the population increased to 2700.

Geography
It includes the easternmost point in the state of Iowa, on the Mississippi River in Elk River township in the northeast section of the county.

Major highways

Adjacent counties
Jackson County  (north)
Carroll County, Illinois  (northeast)
Whiteside County, Illinois  (east)
Rock Island County, Illinois  (southeast)
Scott County  (south)
Cedar County  (southwest)
Jones County  (northwest)

National protected area
 Upper Mississippi River National Wildlife and Fish Refuge (part)

Demographics

2020 census
There were 21,517 housing units of which 19,483 were occupied.

2010 census
There were 21,733 housing units, of which 20,223 were occupied.

2000 census

As of the census of 2000, there were 50,149 people, 20,105 households, and 13,671 families residing in the county.  The population density was 72 people per square mile (28/km2).  There were 21,585 housing units at an average density of 31 per square mile (12/km2).  The racial makeup of the county was 95.87% White, 1.89% Black or African American, 0.24% Native American, 0.56% Asian, 0.02% Pacific Islander, 0.34% from other races, and 1.08% from two or more races.  1.25% of the population were Hispanic or Latino of any race.

There were 20,105 households, out of which 31.80% had children under the age of 18 living with them, 54.60% were married couples living together, 9.80% had a female householder with no husband present, and 32.00% were non-families. 27.40% of all households were made up of individuals, and 12.20% had someone living alone who was 65 years of age or older.  The average household size was 2.44 and the average family size was 2.98.

In the county, the population was spread out, with 25.60% under the age of 18, 8.20% from 18 to 24, 27.00% from 25 to 44, 23.30% from 45 to 64, and 15.80% who were 65 years of age or older.  The median age was 38 years. For every 100 females there were 94.30 males.  For every 100 females age 18 and over, there were 91.20 males.

The median income for a household in the county was $37,423, and the median income for a family was $46,450. Males had a median income of $35,049 versus $21,333 for females. The per capita income for the county was $17,724.  About 7.70% of families and 10.20% of the population were below the poverty line, including 13.70% of those under age 18 and 7.80% of those age 65 or over.

Communities

Cities

Andover
Calamus
Camanche
Charlotte
Clinton
DeWitt
Delmar
Goose Lake
Grand Mound
Lost Nation
Low Moor
Toronto
Welton
Wheatland

Unincorporated communities
Big Rock
Bryant
Buena Vista
Elvira
Elwood
Folletts
Petersville
Teeds Grove

Townships
Clinton County is divided into these townships:

 Bloomfield
 Brookfield
 Camanche
 Center
 De Witt
 Deep Creek
 Eden
 Elk River
 Grant
 Hampshire
 Liberty
 Olive
 Orange
 Sharon
 Spring Rock
 Washington
 Waterford
 Welton

Population ranking
The population ranking of the following table is based on the 2020 census of Clinton County.
† county seat

Politics
Similar to many other counties in Iowa, Clinton County was reliably Democratic from Michael Dukakis's win in 1988 until 2016, when Trump flipped many counties in Iowa. He improved on his results in 2020.

See also

National Register of Historic Places listings in Clinton County, Iowa
Clinton County Courthouse

References

External links

Clinton County government's website
Clinton County Development Association

 
1837 establishments in Wisconsin Territory
Populated places established in 1837
Iowa counties on the Mississippi River